Jigokuhen may refer to:

"Hell Screen" (Japanese: 地獄変), 1918 short story by Ryūnosuke Akutagawa
Portrait of Hell (Japanese: 地獄変), 1969 film by Shirō Toyoda based on the story